Schriber is a surname. Notable people with this name:

 Sasha A. Schriber, film director. 
 Thomas J. Schriber (born 1935), American academic and Professor of Technology and Operations